Leandro Leguizamón (born December 4, 1988 in Buenos Aires) is an Argentine professional footballer who plays for Murciélagos of Ascenso MX.

External links

Liga MX players
Living people
1988 births
Argentine footballers
Footballers from Buenos Aires
Association football forwards
21st-century Argentine people